Jan Brouwer (born 1939/1940) is a Dutch former football manager who was the manager of Angolan side Sagrada Esperança, a position he undertook in April 2008.

He previously managed the Zambia national team in 2001, Petro Atlético in 2004, and Primeiro de Agosto from 2004 to 2007, who he had led to the title in 2006, their first since 1999, as well as the Cup.

References

External links

 Jan Brouwer Interview

Year of birth missing (living people)
Living people
Dutch football managers
Dutch expatriate football managers
Willem II (football club) managers
FC Volendam managers
Helmond Sport managers
Expatriate football managers in Angola
Expatriate football managers in Zambia
Dutch expatriate sportspeople in Zambia
Zambia national football team managers
C.D. Primeiro de Agosto managers
Fortuna Vlaardingen managers